Bahirgachi is a village in the Ranaghat II CD block in the Ranaghat subdivision of the Nadia district of West Bengal, India. It is known for the railway station (halt) which connects  Gede, Ranaghat and Sealdah in Kolkata Suburban Railway system in Eastern Railway.

Geography

Bahirgachi is 84 km north of Kolkata (Calcutta). It is connected to Aranghata, Bhaina, Bagula by road and rail.

Bahirgachi is a typical Bengali village with all basic amenities. The Bahirgachi Gram Panchayat includes a high school,  a playground, a post office, a Grameen Bank, a telephone exchange, two Haat (local market), a railway station, and several primary schools.

Administration
Krishnanagar is the district headquarters for Bahirgachi gram panchayat.

Ranaghat is sub-division, where the SDO is administrative head of the region.

The nearest police station is at Dhantala.

Demographics
According to the 2011 Census of India, Bahirgachi had a total population of 9,785, of which 4,985 (51%) were males and 4,800 (49%) were females. Population in the age range 0–6 years was 801. The total number of literate persons in Bahirgachi was 7,245 (80.64% of the population over 6 years).

Gallery

References

External links
 Bahirgachi is in news from Howrah.org brings up the news of Bahirgachi. Retrieved 14-Aug-2008

Villages in Nadia district